Xavier Debernis is a French former competitive ice dancer. With his skating partner, Isabelle Sarech, he became the 1989 Nebelhorn Trophy champion, 1990 Skate America silver medalist, 1991 Skate Electric bronze medalist, and a two-time French national bronze medalist.

The two were coached by Gérard G., the husband of Debernis' elder sister, in Lyon.

Competitive highlights 
 with Sarech

References 

French male ice dancers
Living people
Year of birth missing (living people)